The African pygmy mouse (Mus minutoides) is one of the smallest rodents. It is widespread within sub-Saharan Africa, and is kept as a pet in other parts of the world. Like the common house mouse, it is a member of the enormous superfamily Muroidea, which includes about 1000 different species.

Grey to brick-red overall, it is pale on the underside and has small but prominent triangular ears.

African pygmy mice reach breeding age at about 6 to 8 weeks. Pregnancy lasts for around 20 days and the litter of about three young is born blind and hairless. Their eyes open after 2 weeks, and weaning is complete after 4 weeks. The lifespan is about 2 years, although individual specimens have been reported to live over 4 years in captivity.Newborn puppies weight between 0,1and 0,6g the longest recordded lifespan of the African dwarf mouse is 4 years 6 months. 

The African pygmy mouse has a number of unique traits.  It stacks pebbles in front of its burrow.  Overnight, the pebbles gather dew and in the morning, the pygmy mouse drinks the dew on the pebbles.  After that, it retires to its den. Its method of sex determination has also been found to differ from most mammals in that rearrangements of the X chromosome have led to many XY individuals actually being female.

They live in colonies or in pairs in grass close to water and are excellent climbers.

As pets
Pygmy mice are often kept as pets, but require social interaction, so should always be kept as pairs or small colonies. They have quite simple care needs, and are active during both day and night, making them interesting exotic pets to own, but cannot be handled due to the risk of inadvertently causing internal damage due to their small size and tendency to jump when startled.

References 

Mammals described in 1834
Mus (rodent)
Rodents of Africa
Mammals of Zambia